Nesterovsky District is an administrative district (raion), one of the fifteen in Kaliningrad Oblast, Russia. As a municipal division, it is incorporated as Nesterovsky Municipal District. It is located in the southeast of the oblast and borders with Krasnoznamensky District in the north, Marijampolė County to the east in Lithuania, Warmia-Masuria in the south in Poland and with Gusevsky and Ozyorsky Districts in the west. Its administrative center is the town of Nesterov. Population:  17,250 (2002 Census);  The population of Nesterov accounts for 28.3% of the district's total population.

Border crossings
In Nesterov, there is a border railway station to Lithuania on the line from Kaliningrad to Moscow. In Chernyshevskoye, an important border crossing point on the principal road connecting Kaliningrad to Moscow is located.

Miscellaneous
Near the settlement of Yasnaya Polyana, the former stable of the Trakehner horse breed is located, as well as a museum for the breed.

References

Notes

Sources

Districts of Kaliningrad Oblast